Uwe Neupert (born 5 August 1957) is a retired East German heavyweight freestyle wrestler. He competed at the 1980 and 1988 Olympics and placed second and fourth, respectively. Between 1978 and 1989 he collected 18 medals at the world and European championships, including five gold medals. He won both the European and world title in 1978.

References

External links
 

1957 births
Living people
People from Greiz
People from Bezirk Gera
German male sport wrestlers
Sportspeople from Thuringia
Olympic wrestlers of East Germany
Wrestlers at the 1980 Summer Olympics
Wrestlers at the 1988 Summer Olympics
Olympic silver medalists for East Germany
Olympic medalists in wrestling
Medalists at the 1980 Summer Olympics
World Wrestling Championships medalists
Recipients of the Patriotic Order of Merit in bronze